Rupert Fankhauser is an Austrian clarinetist. He is also a lecturer at the University of Music and Performing Arts Vienna.

Education 
Fankhauser studied clarinet at the University of Music and Performing Arts Vienna.

Career 
In 1985, Fankhauser became the principal clarinetist of the Municipal Theatre of Klagenfurt and the Carinthian Symphony Orchestra. He was also the principal clarinetist of the Gustav Mahler Youth Orchestra. He was principal clarinetist for the Cape Town Symphony Orchestra for the 1993–94 season. He has toured with the Vienna Philharmonic and the Berlin Philharmonic, and has soloed with the Vienna Chamber Orchestra and the Orchestra i Pomeriggi Musicali. He has been a member of the Vienna Clarinet Connection since 1999.

References

Austrian male musicians
Austrian clarinetists
Living people
University of Music and Performing Arts Vienna alumni
Year of birth missing (living people)
Place of birth missing (living people)
21st-century clarinetists
21st-century male musicians